National Highway 752 (NH 752) is a  National Highway in India.

References

National highways in India